Heather Candace "Candy" Finnigan (born May 18, 1946) is a professional interventionist who appears regularly in the A&E show Intervention. She received her Certification in Chemical Dependency from UCLA and interned at Cedars-Sinai Hospital.

A recovering alcoholic for 33 years, Candy Finnigan wrote When Enough is Enough: A Comprehensive Guide to Successful Intervention, "a tell-it-like-it-is guide to the process of intervention; a must read if you're interested in conducting an intervention." She is a graduate of University of Kansas and was married to Mike Finnigan, a musician and former basketball player for over 45 years.  She and her late husband Mike have two children: daughter, Bridget, and son, Kelly.

Finnigan is a Board Registered Interventionist (Level) II.

References

External links
Intervention website
Interview with William Simmons, Harvard Independent

Living people
Alcohol abuse counselors
University of Kansas alumni
1946 births